Kolun is a village in the municipalities of Foča, Republika Srpska and Foča-Ustikolina, Bosnia and Herzegovina.

Demographics 
According to the 2013 census, its population was 17, all living in the Republika Srpska part, thus none living in the Foča-Ustikolina part.

References

Villages in Republika Srpska
Populated places in Foča